Jeet is a 1949 Hindi drama film directed by Mohan Sinha and produced by Pratap A. Rana.

Plot
India has finally won independence from British rule, and there are signs of progress among the population. One such sign of progress is in the village where two childhood sweethearts, namely Jeet and Vijay live. Vijay lives with his mom and brother Ratan. Ratan, who lives abroad, returns home to India, with all new ideas of progress and advancement. This is not met well with some of the villagers, including Jeet and Vijay themselves. Ratan overhears a conversation that Vijay is not his real brother, and asks Vijay to leave the house, despite his mother's protests. Self-respecting Vijay leaves the house, and Ratan plans to marry Jeet, and schemes with some villagers that will revolutionize his plans for progress, and make Vijay the culprit.

Cast
 Dev Anand as Vijay
 Suraiya as Jeet
 Kanhaiyalal Chaturvedi as Jeet's uncle
 Madan Puri as Ratan
 Suraiya Chowdhary as Jeet's cousin
 S.P. Mahendra 
 Shribhagwan
 Habib
 Durga Khote

References

External links
 
 
 Jeet at Gomolo

1949 films
1940s Hindi-language films
Films set in India
Films shot in Mumbai
Indian drama films
1949 drama films
Indian black-and-white films
Hindi-language drama films